The Pseudonocardiaceae are a family of bacteria in the order Actinomycetales and the only member of the suborder Pseudonocardineae.

Genomics
The species within the family Pseudonocardiaceae form a distinct clade in phylogenetic trees based on concatenated protein sequences. Additionally, Nakamurella multipartite, currently part of the order Frankiales, also formed a clade with the Pseudonocardiaceae species in 100% of the bootstrap replications of the phylogenetic trees. A conserved signature indel has been identified which is found in N. multipartite and all but one of the Pseudonocardiaceae species. This one-amino-acid insertion in UMP kinase serves to both provide a molecular marker for nearly all of the Pseudonocardiaceae and suggests N. multipartite is closely related to this group. Some evidence also suggests the orders Pseudonocardiales and Corynebacteriales are closely related. Several conserved signature indels have been identified which are found in both Pseudonocardiales and Corynebacteriales, including a three-amino-acid insertion in a conserved region of UDP-galactopyranose mutase. This insertion is also present in N. multipartite and Geodermatophilus obscurus, another member of Frankiales. Additionally, five conserved signature proteins have been identified which are found only in the orders Pseudonocardiales and Corynebacterialess. Homologs of the proteins are generally found in N. multipartite and G. obscurus, providing additional evidence of these two species being closely related to the orders Pseudonocardiales and Corynebacteriales.

Genera
Pseudonocardiaceae comprises the following genera:

 Actinoalloteichus Tamura et al. 2000

 Actinocrispum Hatano et al. 2016
 Actinokineospora Hasegawa 1988
 Actinomycetospora Jiang et al. 2008
 Actinophytocola Indananda et al. 2010
 Actinopolyspora Gochnauer et al. 1975 (Approved Lists 1980)
 Actinorectispora Quadri et al. 2016
 Actinosynnema Hasegawa et al. 1978 (Approved Lists 1980)

 Allokutzneria Labeda and Kroppenstedt 2008
 Allosaccharopolyspora Teo et al. 2021

 Amycolatopsis Lechevalier et al. 1986
 Bounagaea Meklat et al. 2015
 Crossiella Labeda 2001

 Gandjariella Ningsih et al. 2019

 Goodfellowiella Labeda et al. 2008
 Haloactinomyces Lai et al. 2017
 Haloechinothrix Tang et al. 2010
 Halopolyspora Lai et al. 2014
 Halosaccharopolyspora Teo et al. 2021
 Herbihabitans Zhang et al. 2016
 Kibdelosporangium Shearer et al. 1986
 Kutzneria Stackebrandt et al. 1994
 Labedaea Lee 2012

 Lentzea Yassin et al. 1995
 Longimycelium Xia et al. 2013

 Prauserella Kim and Goodfellow 1999

 Pseudonocardia Henssen 1957 (Approved Lists 1980)
 Qaidamihabitans Tian et al. 2022
 Saccharomonospora Nonomura and Ohara 1971 (Approved Lists 1980)
 Saccharopolyspora Lacey and Goodfellow 1975 (Approved Lists 1980)
 Saccharothrix Labeda et al. 1984
 Salinifilum Moshtaghi Nikou et al. 2017
 Sciscionella Tian et al. 2009
 Solihabitans Jin et al. 2022
 Streptoalloteichus (ex Tomita et al. 1978) Tomita et al. 1987
 Tamaricihabitans Qin et al. 2015
 Thermocrispum Korn-Wendisch et al. 1995
 Thermotunica Wu et al. 2014
 Umezawaea Labeda and Kroppenstedt 2007

Phylogeny
The currently accepted taxonomy is based on the List of Prokaryotic names with Standing in Nomenclature (LPSN). The phylogeny is based on whole-genome analysis.

Notes

References

Pseudonocardiales